"Never Ending Story" is the title song from the English version of the 1984 film The NeverEnding Story. It was produced and composed by Italian musician Giorgio Moroder and performed by English pop singer Limahl. He released two versions of the song, one in English and one in French. The English version featured vocals by Beth Anderson, and the French version, titled L'Histoire Sans Fin, featured vocals by Ann Calvert. It was a success in many countries, reaching No. 1 in both Norway and Sweden, No. 2 in Austria, West Germany and Italy, No. 4 in the UK, No. 6 in Australia and No. 6 on the US Billboard Adult Contemporary chart.

Background and writing
The song was composed by Giorgio Moroder with lyrics by Keith Forsey, though it (and other electronic pop elements of the soundtrack) is not present in the German version of the film, which features Klaus Doldinger's score exclusively.

Beth Anderson recorded her words in America separately from Limahl's. Anderson does not appear in the music video; frequent Limahl back-up singer Mandy Newton lip-syncs Anderson's part.

Legacy
In the final episode of the third season of Stranger Things, set in 1985, "Never Ending Story" is sung by Dustin (Gaten Matarazzo) and his long-distance girlfriend Suzie (Gabriella Pizzolo) as a way to reconnect after not seeing each other for some time. Following the season's release on July 4, 2019, interest in "The NeverEnding Story" surged; viewership of the original music video had increased by 800% within a few days according to YouTube, while Spotify reported an 825% increase in stream requests for the song. Limahl expressed gratitude towards Netflix for this; while he had not watched the series, he was told of the song's inclusion by his nephews and watched clips of the duet. Limahl had previously found a similar increase in his past work when the network used his band Kajagoogoo's song "Too Shy" in Black Mirror: Bandersnatch.

Track listings

 7" single
 "Never Ending Story"
 "Ivory Tower" by Giorgio Moroder

 12" single
 "Never Ending Story" (club mix) – 6:09
 "Never Ending Story" (instrumental version) – 5:28

 12" maxi
 "Never Ending Story" (12" mix) – 5:17
 "Never Ending Story" (7" mix) – 3:30
 "Ivory Tower" (12" mix) (instrumental) by Giorgio Moroder – 5:54

 iTunes single
 "Never Ending Story" (12" mix) – 5:20
 "Never Ending Story" (Giorgio 7" mix) – 3:31
 "Never Ending Story" (Rusty 7" mix) – 3:54
 "Never Ending Story" (12" dance mix) – 6:08
 "Never Ending Story" (12" dub mix) – 5:27
 "Ivory Tower" by Giorgio Moroder – 3:08
 "Ivory Tower" (12" mix) by Giorgio Moroder – 5:55

Official mixes
 "Never Ending Story" (7" mix) – 3:28
 "Never Ending Story" (12" mix) – 5:17
 "Never Ending Story" (club mix) – 6:09
 "Never Ending Story" (instrumental version) – 5:28

Personnel
 Limahl – lead vocals and backing vocals
 Beth Anderson – lead vocals and backing vocals
 Dee Harris – electric guitar
 Giorgio Moroder – synthesizers, sequencer and sampler
 Keith Forsey – drum machine

Charts

Weekly charts

Year-end charts

Certifications

Cover versions
 For The NeverEnding Story II: The Next Chapter, the song was performed by Joe Milner, heard during the closing credits.
 J-pop group E-Girls covered a Japanese version of the song in 2013. It debuted in the second place of the Oricon weekly singles chart.
 American pop punk group New Found Glory covered the song on their 2000 EP From the Screen to Your Stereo.
 Shooter Jennings and Brandi Carlile covered the song on Jennings' 2016 Giorgio Moroder tribute album Countach (For Giorgio).

References

External links
 The NeverEnding Story single
 Limahl Official British Website
 KajaFax - The Officially Approved Limahl & Kajagoogoo Community & Fan Club
 Unofficial Limahl & Kajagoogoo YouTube video archives

1984 songs
1984 singles
Limahl songs
Number-one singles in Norway
Number-one singles in Spain
Number-one singles in Sweden
Oricon International Singles Chart number-one singles
Songs written by Giorgio Moroder
Songs written by Keith Forsey
Song recordings produced by Giorgio Moroder
Works based on The Neverending Story
E-girls songs
EMI Records singles